"Endless Forms Most Beautiful" is a song by Finnish symphonic metal band Nightwish. It is the second single from their eighth album "Endless Forms Most Beautiful". The song was announced on April 17, 2015, alongside its release date and cover, and was eventually released on May 8, 2015 together with a lyric video.

According to band's bass player Marko Hietala, Endless Forms Most Beautiful was chosen for a single because the band wanted a heavier song for a single after Élan and it has a "simple structure, killer chorus and goes well for a video purpose." Keyboardist and songwriter Tuomas Holopainen commented that the song was heavily inspired by Richard Dawkins' book The Ancestor's Tale.

Track listing 
CD version

Vinyl version

Personnel
Nightwish
 Floor Jansen – lead vocals
 Marko Hietala – bass, vocals 
 Emppu Vuorinen – guitars
 Tuomas Holopainen – keyboards, piano
 Troy Donockley – uilleann pipes, tin whistle, backing vocals

Additional musicians
 Kai Hahto – drums
 Pip Williams – orchestral arrangements
 James Shearman – Conductor
 Metro Voices – choir

References

2015 songs
Songs written by Tuomas Holopainen
Nuclear Blast Records singles
Nightwish songs
Evolution in popular culture
Richard Dawkins